is the theatrical film for the 2011-2012 Kamen Rider franchise drama Kamen Rider Fourze. The film was released on August 4, 2012, alongside the Super Sentai franchise film Tokumei Sentai Go-Busters the Movie: Protect the Tokyo Enetower!. The film also features the debut of the titular character of Kamen Rider Wizard.

Plot
A transaction between Mitsuaki Gamou and Foundation X goes awry after Inga Blink steals replica Horoscope Switches from them. Gamou orders his subordinates not to pursue her and chooses to have the Kamen Rider Club from Amanogawa High School (AGHS) do so instead.

The club meets with Shizuka Shirayama of OSTO Legacy, who requests their help. The club agrees, but while travelling to the organization, they are attacked by Blink and her robotic partner Black Knight. Club members Gentaro Kisaragi and Ryusei Sakuta fight them, but Blink destroys their van and wounds Sakuta before retreating with Black Knight. Despite this setback, the group reaches OSTO Legacy and meets its general manager, Harumi Saeba, who reveals Blink and Black Knight are members of the Alicia Federation, who created Cosmic Energy-powered androids called Kyodain. OSTO Legacy needs the club's help to destroy the federation's strongest Kyodain, XVII, though Kisaragi intends to befriend it instead. After receiving astronaut and combat training, the club prepares to board the shuttle Exodus. Blink uses the Switches she stole to create simulacrums of the Horoscopes to stop them. As the others race to the shuttle, Kisaragi and Sakuta stay behind to destroy most of the Horoscopes before Kamen Rider Wizard arrives to destroy the remaining simulacra and allow the pair to rejoin their friends.

Arriving at XVII, the club, Shirayama, and Saeba learn Blink and Black Knight stowed away on the Exodus before fighting them. While the club plants explosives, Sakuta and Tomoko Nozama discover Shirayama and Saeba lied to them. With their ruse exposed, Saeba and Shirayama assume their true forms: the Kyodain Groundain and Skydain. Blink reveals that her father Professor Blink created the Kyodain, who acquired sentience and killed him out of a sense of superiority before XVII locked them in human forms and trapped them on Earth. The Kyodain destroy XVII's mainframe to regain their full capabilities and attempt to kill the club.

While the club and Blink escape to the ship, Black Knight sacrifices himself to protect them while Kisaragi and Sakuta battle the Kyodain. The androids overpower them before converting XVII into its robot form to attack Earth, but XVII saves the Riders and activates its self-destruct sequence to stop the Kyodain. Refusing to let XVII sacrifice himself, Kisaragi expends his Rider powers to force the robot through a warp gate and onto the moon. He befriends XVII and stops him from self-destructing, but the Kyodain launch a counterattack. XVII sends them an email with specs for a new Astroswitch. The club gathers Kisaragi's current Astroswitches, distributes them to everyone Kisaragi befriended at AGHS, and convinces them to activate them all simultaneously, causing a chain reaction that creates the new Astroswitch. Kisaragi uses it to fuse his Rider powers with Sakuta's, allowing him to overwhelm and destroy the Kyodain. After restoring his systems, XVII thanks the club before leaving to explore and find his place in the universe.

Cast
 : 
 : 
 : 
 : 
 : 
 : 
 : 
 : 
 : 
 : 
 : 
 : 
 : 
 : 
 : 
 : 
 : 
 Female executive member of : 
 Announcer: 
 : 
Cameos
 : 
 : 
 : 
 : 
 : 
 : 
 : 
 : 
 : 
 : 
 : 
 : 
 : 
 : 
 : 
 : 
 : 
 : 
 : 
 : 
 : 
 : 
 : 
 : 
 : 
 : 
 : 
 : 
 : 
 : 
 : 
 :

Theme songs
Main film theme
 "Voyagers"
 Lyrics: Shoko Fujibayashi
 Composition & Arrangement: COZZi
 Artist: 
Insert Songs
 "Giant Step Rock'nRoll States edit"
 Lyrics: Shoko Fujibayashi
 Composition & Arrangement: Shuhei Naruse
 Artist: Astronauts (May'n & Yoshiharu Shiina)
A rock and roll remix of "Giant Step" makes its debut in the film, having never been used in the Kamen Rider Fourze broadcast run.
"Switch On! Orchestra Version"
 A symphonic variation of "Switch On!" that was played in the TV series' final two episodes.

References

External links
 
 Official website for Space, Here We Come! & Go-Busters: Protect the Tokyo Enetower!

2012 films
Fourze the Movie: Space, Here We Come!
Films directed by Koichi Sakamoto
Fourze the Movie: Space, Here We Come!
Movie